Kashiram Rana (7 April 1938 – 31 August 2012) was an Indian politician and a member of the Bharatiya Janata Party (BJP) of India. In 1989, he was elected to the 9th Lok Sabha from Surat constituency in Gujarat. He was re-elected to the Lok Sabha in 1991, 1996, 1998, 1999 and 2004 from the same constituency. He served as a union cabinet minister in the department of textiles, twice, in the Atal Bihari Vajpayee led NDA govt during 1998–2004. He died on 31 August 2012.

Rana was being increasingly sidelined within the BJP and recently he had sided with Keshubhai Patel and played a pivotal role in forming the Gujarat Parivartan Party.

Early life and education

His Father's Name was Shri Chhabildas and mother's Name was	Smt. Kashiben. He was born on 07 Apr 1938 at Surat (Gujarat). his Spouse's Name was	Late Smt. Pushpa. He has 2 sons and 4 Daughters. He did B.Com., LL.B. from South-Gujarat University, Surat (Gujarat).
By Profession he was an	Advocate and Social Worker.

Positions Held

1. 1975-80	Member, Gujarat Legislative Assembly
2. 1977-80	Chairman, Committee on Public Undertakings, Gujarat Legislative Assembly
3. 1983-84 and 1987	Mayor, Municipal Corporation, Surat
4. 1985-87 and 1993-96	President, Bharatiya Janata Party (B.J.P.), Gujarat
5. 1989	Elected to 9th Lok Sabha
6. 1990-91	Member, Rules Committee
7. Member, Consultative Committee, Ministry of Railways
8. 1991	Re-elected to 10th Lok Sabha (2nd term)
9. 1991-92	Member, Public Accounts Committee
10. Member, Consultative Committee, Ministry of Industry
11. 1996	Re-elected to 11th Lok Sabha (3rd term)
12. 1996-97	Member, Estimates Committee
13. Member, Committee on Commerce
14. Member, Joint Parliamentary Committee on Broadcasting Bill
15. 1998	Re-elected to 12th Lok Sabha (4th term)
16. 1998-99	Union Cabinet Minister, Textiles
17. 1999	Re-elected to 13th Lok Sabha (5th term)
18. 13 Oct. 1999 - 23 May 2003	Union Cabinet Minister, Textiles
19. 24 May 2003- May 2004	Union Cabinet Minister, Rural Development
20. 2004	Re-elected to 14th Lok Sabha( 6th term)

References

External links
 Official biographical sketch in Parliament of India website

People from Gujarat
2012 deaths
People from Surat
India MPs 2004–2009
1938 births
India MPs 1989–1991
India MPs 1991–1996
India MPs 1996–1997
India MPs 1998–1999
India MPs 1999–2004
Mayors of Surat
Lok Sabha members from Gujarat
Bharatiya Janata Party politicians from Gujarat
Gujarat Parivartan Party politicians
Politicians from Surat